Revolution and Justice (RJ) was an armed group based in northwestern part of the Central African Republic.

History 

On 1 November 2013 Revolution and Justice established training camp in Boloum near Paoua. On 24 December RJ attacked Beboura killing 45 Seleka fighters. On 22 January 2014 heavy clashes erupted in Boguila between RJ and Seleka leading to 22 Seleka fighters being killed. On 24 January RJ took control of Bojomo on Boguila-Markounda axis after killing 13 Seleka fighters. In January it took control of Paoua. In February RJ took control of Bang near Ngaoundaye. On 29 March  RJ captured Bedaka north of Paoua after clashes with Séléka forces.

On 20 January 2018 heavy clashes broke out between RJ and MNLC north of Paoua forcing 60,000 people to seek refugee in city On 30 January RJ agreed to voluntarily dissolve itself, becoming first group to do so. On 9 April  heavy clashes erupted between RJ and MNLC in Betin village north of Paoua. Since August 2018 it was reported that RJ was still present at Paoua-Betoko axis extorting local population and erecting checkpoints.

In February 2019 two factions of Revolution and Justice signed peace agreement with the government. In July 2019 RJ reportedly completed its disarmament.

References 

Factions of the Central African Republic Civil War
Rebel groups in the Central African Republic